Butzbach station is a station in the town of Butzbach in the German state of Hesse on the Main–Weser Railway. The station was formerly the starting point of the Butzbach–Lich railway leading to Lich and Grünberg.The station is classified by Deutsche Bahn as a category 4 station.

History
The station was opened along with the Butzbach–Friedberg section of the Main-Weser Railway on 9 November 1850.

On 28 March 1904, the Butzbach–Lich railway was opened. This had its own station, Butzbach West station, adjacent to the state station. From here, trains ran via Butzbach Ost, which is still the location of the line's operations, and Griedel to Lich Süd near the Gießen–Gelnhausen railway (also known as the Lahn-Kinzig Railway). On 1 August 1909, this line was extended to Grünberg, to connect with the Gießen–Fulda railway. Another line opened on 2 April 1910 branched off from Griedel through the Wetter valley to Bad Nauheim Nord. The last section from Butzbach Ost to Oberkleen, then in the Prussian district of Wetzlar, was completed on 1 June 1910. On 27 May 1961, passenger and freight traffic ended on the section of the line between Butzbach and Lich. The last passenger service between Butzbach and Bad Nauheim Nord ran on 31 May 1975.

Services

Since the cessation of passenger service on the BLE, Butzbach station is no longer a railway junction. However, several Regional-Express and Regionalbahn services stop in Butzbach. Most important is the Mittelhessen-Express, which runs from Frankfurt Main Station via Friedberg and Butzbach to Gießen. There, it splits into two sections: the front section of the train continues via Marburg to Treysa, while the rear section reverses and continues through Wetzlar and Herborn to Dillenburg. Regionalbahn services run from Friedberg via Bad Nauheim, Butzbach, Langgöns and Großen-Linden to Gießen. During the peak hours Butzbach is served by individual Regional-Express services that run from Frankfurt via Giessen to Marburg. Long-distance services run non-stop through the station.

Butzbach station has not been made barrier-free for the disabled. In 2009, the station was equipped with an electronic passenger information system.

Buses
There is a large bus station at Butzbach station, which is served by regional and city buses to the city of Butzbach, the Butzbach suburbs and the surrounding villages and towns.

There is also a park and ride facility at the station, which is operated by the city of Butzbach.

Notes

External links

Railway stations in Hesse
Buildings and structures in Wetteraukreis
Railway stations in Germany opened in 1850